This is a list of individuals, groups of individuals, and companies who have owned and operated a professional sports organization. The list is organized first by sport, then by franchise or team, then by owner. If an organization has gone through a significant change (e.g. the team has moved and/or changed names), that information is noted after the years of ownership.

Association football club owners

England

Premier League owners 
Arsenal
Stan Kroenke

Aston Villa
Owned by a large number of shareholders until 1968. Since that time:
Doug Ellis (largest single shareholder 1968–1975; majority shareholder 1982–2006)
Randy Lerner (2006–2016)
Recon Sports Limited (2016–2019)
NSWE Group (a company owned by Wes Edens and Nassef Sawiris) (2019–Present)

Chelsea
Roman Abramovich (2003-2022)
Todd Boehly (Eldridge Industries) (2022–Present)
Clearlake Capital (2022–Present)
Hansjoerg Wyss (Wyss Foundation) 
(2022–Present)
Mark Walter (Gugglenheim Baseball Management) (2022–Present)

Everton
Farhad Moshiri

Liverpool
 Moores family, among them John Moores and David Moores (1930s-2007)
 George Gillett, Tom Hicks (2007–2010)
 Fenway Sports Group (2010–present); LeBron James acquired a minority interest in April 2011

Manchester City
Manchester City Limited — The club's holding company; owned by a large number of shareholders until 2007 (see Ownership of Manchester City F.C.). Since then, the holding company has been owned by:
Thaksin Shinawatra (2007–2008)
Abu Dhabi United Group (2008–present)

Manchester United
Manchester United plc (NYSE : MANU) – The club's holding company, owned by shareholders.  The primary owner is:
Avram and Joel Glazer (brothers who are co-chairmen, 2014–present)

Newcastle United
Mike Ashley
Saudi Arabia Public Investment Fund (holds a 80% share)
Amanda Staveley (holds a 10% share)
Reuben Brothers (hold 10% share)

Tottenham Hotspur
Daniel Levy

West Ham United
 Terry Brown (??–2006)
 Björgólfur Guðmundsson (90%), Eggert Magnússon (5%), and other minority investors (2006–2007)
 Björgólfur Guðmundsson (2007–2009)
 CB Holding (formerly 70% owned by Straumur Investment Bank and 30% owned by Byr and MP banks; now nationalised by the Icelandic government) (100% 2009–2010; no more than 50% 2010–present)
 David Gold and David Sullivan (50% and operational control, 2010–present)

EFL Championship owners 
Fulham
Shahid Khan

Middlesbrough
Steve Gibson (1986–1993 as head of consortium; 1993–present as majority owner)

Reading
John Madejski

Wigan Athletic
Dave Whelan

EFL League One owners 
Sunderland
Drumaville Consortium (2006–2009)
Ellis Short (2009–present)

Italian Serie A owners

Spain

La Liga owners 

Athletic Bilbao, Osasuna, Barcelona and Real Madrid:  these four clubs are not organised as limited companies, but remain as registered associations due to a grandfather clause of the late 1980s. Unlike a limited company, it is not possible to purchase shares in these club, but only membership. Each club member (socio) has a vote to elect democratically the club president and board of directors. The club president cannot invest his own money into the club and the club can only spend what it earns, which is mainly derived through merchandise sales, television rights and ticket sales. This means that each club is owned by its own registered supporters. FC Barcelona has over 150.000 socios, Real Madrid counts over 100.000 socios, Athletic Club over 40.000 and Osasuna over 15.000.

Atlético Madrid: major shareholders are the Gil Marin family which owns 50% of the shares, these used to belong to former club president Jesús Gil y Gil; Israeli businessman Idan Ofer, 33%; current president Enrique Cerezo 10% and the Chinese Wanda Group a 2%.

Eibar: more than 11.130 shareholders located across 65 countries due to a crowdfunding campaign in 2014. There is no major shareholder with an ownership over 5%.

Real Sociedad: Due to club's statutes no shareholder has vote rights over 2% of the shares.

Germany

Bundesliga owners 
Bundesliga clubs are required to be majority-owned by German club members (known as the 50+1 rule to discourage control by a single entity) and operate under tight restrictions on the use of debt for acquisitions (a team only receives an operating license if it has solid financials).
Exceptions:
Bayer Leverkusen
Bayer AG

VfL Wolfsburg
Volkswagen

1899 Hoffenheim
SAP co-founder Dietmar Hopp

RB Leipzig
Red Bull

France

Ligue 1 owners 
Ajaccio

Angers
Saïd Chabane

Auxerre
James Zhou

Brest
Denis Lesaint

Clermont
Ahmet Schaefer

Lens
Joseph Oughourlian

Lille
Merlyn Partners

Lorient
Loïc Féry

Lyon
John Textor et Eagle Football Holdings LLC

Marseille
Frank McCourt

Monaco
Dmitry Rybolovlev

Montpellier
Laurent Nicollin

Nantes
Waldemar Kita

Nice
Jim Ratcliffe

Paris Saint-Germain
Qatar Investment Authority

Reims
Jean-Pierre Caillot

Rennes
François Pinault

Strasbourg
Marc Keller

Troyes
City Football Group

Toulouse
RedBird Capital Group

Netherlands

Eredivisie owners 
Ajax
AFC Ajax N.V. — The club's holding company; owned by a large number of shareholders.

Feyenoord
70% of the shares owned by Stichting Continuïteit Feyenoord, 30% are owned by Vrienden van Feyenoord

PSV Eindhoven
Philips

Vitesse
Valeriy Oyf

Eerste Divisie owners 
ADO Den Haag
United Vansen

USA / Canada

Major League Soccer (MLS) owners 
Austin FC
Anthony Precourt (Precourt Sports Ventures LLC) – (2018–present)

Atlanta United FC
Arthur Blank – (2014–present)

Charlotte FC
David Tepper – (2019–present)

Chicago Fire FC
Anschutz Entertainment Group – (1997–2007)
Andrew Hauptman (Andell Holdings) – (2007–present)

Colorado Rapids
Anschutz Entertainment Group – (1995–2003)
Kroenke Sports & Entertainment – (2003–present)

Columbus Crew
Lamar Hunt – (1995–2006)
Clark Hunt – (2006–2013)
Anthony Precourt (Precourt Sports Ventures LLC) – (2013–2018)
Dee Haslam, Jimmy Haslam, JW and Whitney Johnson, Dr. Pete Edwards – (2019–present)

D.C. United
Washington Soccer, LP – (1995–2000)
Anschutz Entertainment Group – (2001–2006)
William Chang (D.C. United Holdings) – (2006–2012)
William Chang, Erick Thohir and Jason Levien – (2012–present)

FC Cincinnati
 Carl Lindner III – (2018–present)

FC Dallas
Major League Soccer – (1995–2001) (Source)
Lamar Hunt – (2001–2006)
Clark Hunt – (2006–present)

Houston Dynamo FC
Anschutz Entertainment Group – (2005–2008)
Anschutz Entertainment Group, Oscar De La Hoya and Gabriel Brener – (2008–2015)
 Gabriel Brener, Oscar De La Hoya, Jake Silverstein, Ben Guill (2015–present)
 James Harden joined this group in 2019.

Inter Miami CF
David Beckham, Simon Fuller, Marcelo Claure, Jorge and José Mas, Masayoshi Son – (2014–present)

Los Angeles FC
 Peter Guber (Executive Chairman), Henry Nguyen, Tom Penn, Ruben Gnanalingam, Vincent Tan, Brandon Beck, Larry Berg, Will Ferrell, Nomar Garciaparra, Mia Hamm, Chad Hurley, Magic Johnson, Tucker Kain, Kirk Lacob, Mark Leschly, Mike Mahan, Irwin Raij, Tony Robbins, Lon Rosen, Bennett Rosenthal, Paul Schaeffer, Brandon Schneider, Mark Shapiro, Allen Shapiro, Jason Sugarman, Harry Tsao – (2014–present)

LA Galaxy
L.A. Soccer Partners, LP – (1995–1997)
Anschutz Entertainment Group – (1998–present)

Minnesota United FC
Bill McGuire, Jim Pohlad, Robert Pohlad, Glen Taylor, Wendy Carlson Nelson – (2015–present)

CF Montréal
Joey Saputo – (2010–present)

Nashville SC
John Ingram, Mark Wilf, Zygi Wilf, Leonard Wilf, David Dill, Marcus Whitney, Christopher Redhage – (2017–present)

New England Revolution
Robert Kraft – (1995–present)

New York City FC
City Football Group (majority) & Yankee Global Enterprises (minority) – (2013–present)

New York Red Bulls
John Kluge and Stuart Subotnick – (1995–01)
Anschutz Entertainment Group – (2001–06)
Red Bull GmbH – (2006–present)

Orlando City SC
Flávio Augusto da Silva – (2013–present)

Philadelphia Union
Keystone Sports & Entertainment, LLC – (2008–present)
 Kevin Durant joined the ownership group as a minority investor in 2020.

Portland Timbers
Merritt Paulson – (2009–present)

Real Salt Lake
Dave Checketts (SCP Worldwide) – (2004–12)
Dell Loy Hansen – (2012–2020)
Major League Soccer – (2020–2021)
David S. Blitzer and Ryan Smith (Smith Entertainment Group) – (2022–present)

San Jose Earthquakes
Major League Soccer – (1996–1998)
Robert Kraft – (1999–2000)
Silicon Valley Sports Entertainment – (2001–2002)
Silicon Valley Sports Entertainment and Anschutz Entertainment Group – (2002–2003)
Anschutz Entertainment Group – (2003–2005)
Lewis Wolff and John J. Fisher (Earthquakes Soccer, LLC) – (2007–present)

Seattle Sounders FC
Joe Roth (majority), Adrian Hanauer, Estate of Paul Allen and Drew Carey (minority) – (2007–2019)
 Hanauer Fútbol (Adrian Hanauer, Paul Barry, Lenore Hanauer—majority); estate of Paul Allen; Drew Carey; and a group of 11 families, among them Terry Myerson, Macklemore, and Russell Wilson and Ciara – (2019–present)

Sporting Kansas City
Lamar Hunt – (1995–2006)
Sporting Club – (2006–present)(OnGoal, LLC from 2006 to 2010)

Toronto FC
Maple Leaf Sports & Entertainment – (2006–present)

Vancouver Whitecaps FC
Greg Kerfoot, Steve Luczo, Jeff Mallett, Steve Nash – (2009–present)

Future MLS owners
St. Louis City SC
 Carolyn Kindle Betz, Jo Ann Taylor Kindle, Jim Kavanaugh – (2019–present)

National Women's Soccer League (NWSL) owners 

Angel City FC (starts play in 2022)
 Lead investors: Kara Nortman, Alexis and, Serena Williams Ohanian, Natalie Portman, Julie Uhrman
 Other investors: Uzo Aduba, Becky G, Shannon Boxx, Sophia Bush, Jessica Chastain, James Corden, Amanda Cromwell, Deirdre DeLany, Lorrie Fair, Ronnie Fair, Joy Fawcett, America Ferrera, Julie Foudy, Jennifer Garner, Lauren Holiday, Mia Hamm, Angela Hucles, Cobi Jones, Ryan Kalil, Billie Jean King, Ilana Kloss, Eva Longoria, Shannon MacMillan, Casey Neistat, Alexis Olympia Ohanian, Candace Parker, Lilly Singh, P. K. Subban, Rachel Van Hollebeke, Tisha Venturini, Lindsey Vonn, Abby Wambach, Saskia Webber, Lailaa Williams, (2020–present)

Chicago Red Stars
 Arnim Whisler (2012–present)

Houston Dash
 Gabriel Brener, Oscar De La Hoya, Jake Silverstein, Ben Guill (2015–present)
 James Harden joined this group in 2019.

Kansas City
 Lead investors: Angie and Chris Long; other minority investors including Jen Gulvik and Brittany Matthews (2020–present; starts play in 2021)

NJ/NY Gotham FC
 Phil Murphy (majority), Steven Temares, Thomas Hofstetter (2012–present)

North Carolina Courage
 Stephen Malik (2017–present)
 Naomi Osaka bought a minority interest in 2021.

OL Reign
 Bill and Teresa Predmore (2012–2019)
 Bill and Teresa Predmore (majority), The Baseball Club of Tacoma LLC, Adrian Hanauer, Lenore Hanauer (minority) (2019–January 2020)
 OL Groupe (89.5%), Bill and Teresa Predmore (7.5%), Tony Parker (3%) (January 2020–present)

Orlando Pride
Flávio Augusto da Silva (majority) and Phil Rawlins (minority) (2015–2018)
Flávio Augusto da Silva (majority), Phil Rawlins (minority), Albert Friedberg minority (2018–present)

Portland Thorns FC
Merritt Paulson (2012–present)

Racing Louisville FC
Soccer Holdings, LLC (2019–present)

Washington Spirit
 Bill Lynch (2012–2018)
 Steve Baldwin (majority) and Bill Lynch (minority) (2018–present); other minority investors including Jenna Bush Hager, Chelsea Clinton, Dominique Dawes, and Alexander Ovechkin

Greek Superleague owners 
Olympiacos
Evangelos Marinakis

Panathinaikos
Giannis Alafouzos

PAOK
Ivan Savvidis

AEK Athens
Dimitris Melissanidis

Skoda Xanthi
Christos Panopoulos

Auto racing owners & team principals

Formula One team principals 
(Listed by Constructor)
Ferrari
 Ferrari S.p.A.

Haas F1 Team
 Gene Haas

McLaren
McLaren Group – Mumtalakat Holding Company 57%, Mansour Ojjeh 14%, Michael Latifi 10%

Mercedes Grand Prix
Daimler AG 33%
Toto Wolff 33%
Ineos 33%

Aston Martin in Formula One
 Lawrence Stroll

Alpine
 Renault

Red Bull Racing
 Red Bull GmbH

Scuderia AlphaTauri
 Red Bull GmbH

Sauber
Peter Sauber 66%
Monisha Kaltenborn 33%

Williams Grand Prix Engineering
 Dorilton Capital 100%

IndyCar Series team owners 
A. J. Foyt Enterprises
 A. J. Foyt – (1973–present)

Andretti Autosport
 Michael Andretti – (2001–present)
 Barry Green – (1995–2010)

Arrow McLaren SP
 Sam Schmidt – (2001–present)
 Davey Hamilton – (2011–2016)
 Ric Peterson – (2013–present)

Bryan Herta Autosport
 Bryan Herta – (2009–present)

Carlin Motorsport
 Trevor Carlin – (2018–present)

Chip Ganassi Racing
 Chip Ganassi – (1989–present)

Dale Coyne Racing
 Dale Coyne – (1986–present)

Dreyer & Reinbold Racing
 Dennis Reinbold – (2000–present)
 Robbie Buhl – (2000–present)

Ed Carpenter Racing
 Ed Carpenter – (2012–present)

Juncos Racing
 Ricardo Juncos – (2017–present)

Michael Shank Racing
 Michael Shank – (2018–present)

Rahal Letterman Lanigan Racing
 Bobby Rahal – (1991–present)
 David Letterman – (1996–present)
 Mike Lanigan – (2010–present)
 Carl Hogan – (1991–1996)

Team Penske
 Roger Penske – (1968–present)

NASCAR Cup Series team owners 
 23XI Racing
 Michael Jordan – (2021–present)
 Denny Hamlin – (2021–present)

 Gaunt Brothers Racing
 Marty Gaunt - (2017–present)
 Maurice Gaunt - (2017–present)

 Front Row Motorsports
 Bob Jenkins – (2005–present)

 Hendrick Motorsports
 Rick Hendrick – (1984–present)

 Joe Gibbs Racing
 Coy Gibbs - (1992-2022)
 J.D. Gibbs - (1992-2019)
 Joe Gibbs – (1992–present)

 JTG Daugherty Racing
 Brad Daugherty – (2007–present)
 Jodi Geschickter - (1995–present)
 Tad Geschickter – (1995–present)

 Petty GMS Motorsports
 Maurice J. Gallagher Jr. (main interests) – (2021–present)
 Jimmie Johnson (minority interests) – (2022–present)
 Richard Petty (minority interests) – (2021–present)

 Richard Childress Racing
 Richard Childress – (1969–present)

 Rick Ware Racing
 Rick Ware - (1998–present)

 Roush Fenway Keselowski Racing
 Jack Roush – (1988–2007)
 Jack Roush (50%) – (2007–present)
 Fenway Sports Group (50%) – (2007–present)
 Brad Keselowski – (2021–present)

 Spire Motorsports
 Spire Sports + Entertainment – (2019–present)

 Stewart Haas Racing
 Gene Haas - (2002–present)
 Tony Stewart – (2009–present)

 Team Penske
 Roger Penske – (1972–present)

 Trackhouse Racing Team
 Justin Marks – (2021–present)
 Armando Christian Pérez – (2021–present)

 Wood Brothers Racing
 Glen Wood and Leonard Wood – (1953–2019)
 Leonard Wood – (2019–present)

Baseball franchise owners

Major League Baseball owners 
Arizona Diamondbacks
 Jerry Colangelo – (1998–2005)
 Ken Kendrick – (2005-present)

Atlanta Braves
 Ivers Whitney Adams – (1870–1872): Boston Red Stockings
 John Conkey – (1872–1873): Red Stockings
 Charles Porter – (1873–1874): Red Stockings
 Nicholas Apollonio – (1875–1876): Red Stockings
 Arthur Soden  – (1876–1909): Boston Red Caps/Beaneaters
 George & John Dovey – (1907–1909): Boston Beaneaters/Doves
 John Dovey – (1909–1910): Doves
 William Hepburn Russell – (1911): Boston Rustlers
 James Gaffney – (1912–1915): Boston Braves
 Percy Haughton – (1915–1918)
 George W. Grant – (1919–1922)
 Emil Fuchs – (1922–1935)
 Bob Quinn – (1935–1945)
 Lou Perini – (1945–1962): Boston/Milwaukee Braves
 William Bartholomay – (1962–1976): Milwaukee/Atlanta Braves
 Ted Turner – (1976–1996)
 Time Warner – (1996–2007)
 Liberty Media – (2007-present)

Baltimore Orioles
 Henry Killilea – (1901–1902) Milwaukee Brewers
 Robert Hedges – (1902–1915) St. Louis Browns
 Phil Ball – (1915–1933)
 Donald Lee Barnes – (1936–1945)
 Richard Muckerman – (1945–1948)
 Bill DeWitt – (1948–1951)
 Bill Veeck – (1951–1953)
 Jerold Hoffberger & Clarence Miles – (1954–1955) Baltimore Orioles
 Jerold Hoffberger & James Keelty – (1955–1959)
 Jerold Hoffberger & Joe Iglehart – (1959–1965)
 Jerold Hoffberger – (1965–1979)
 Edward Bennett Williams – (1979–1988)
 Eli Jacobs – (1989–1993)
 Peter Angelos – (1993-present)

Boston Red Sox
 Charles Somers – (1901–1903)
 Henry Killilea – (1903–1904)
 John I. Taylor – (1904–1914)
 Jimmy McAleer – (1911–1913)
 Joseph Lannin – (1913–1916)
 Harry Frazee – (1916–1923)
 Bob Quinn – (1923–1933)
 Tom Yawkey – (1933–1976)
 Jean R. Yawkey – (1976–1992)
 JRY Trust – (1992–2002)
 Fenway Sports Group (formerly New England Sports Ventures) (John Henry, Tom Werner, and other investors, including The New York Times Company) – (2002-Present)

Chicago Cubs
 William A. Hulbert – (1876–1882)
 Albert G. Spalding – (1882–1902)
 James Hart – (1902–1905)
 Charles W. Murphy – (1905–1914)
 Charles Phelps Taft – (1914–1916)
 Charles Weeghman – (1916–1921)
 The Wrigley family – (1921–1981)
 William Wrigley, Jr. – (1921–1932)
 Philip K. Wrigley – (1932–1977)
 William Wrigley III – (1977–1981)
 Tribune Company – (1981-2009)
 Joe Ricketts family trust, with Tom Ricketts exercising day-to-day control (2009–present)

Chicago White Sox
 Charles Comiskey – (1900–1931)
 J. Louis Comiskey – (1931–1940)
 Grace Comiskey – (1940–1956)
 Dorothy Comiskey Rigney & Chuck Comiskey – (1956–1958)
 Bill Veeck – (1958–1961)
 Arthur Allyn, Jr. & John Allyn – (1961–1969)
 John Allyn – (1969–1975)
 Bill Veeck – (1975–1981)
 Aaron Cushman – (1975–1981) *
 Jerry Reinsdorf – (1981–present)

Cincinnati Reds
 Justus Thorner – (1882–1890)
 John T. Brush – (1890–1902)
 August Herrmann – (1902–1927)
 C. J. McDiarmid – (1927–1929)
 Sidney Weil – (1929–1933)
 Powel Crosley, Jr. – (1933–1961)
 Bill DeWitt – (1961–1967)
 Francis L. Dale – (1967–1973)
 Louis Nippert – (1973–1980)
 William & James Williams – (1980–1984)
 Marge Schott – (1984–1998)
 Carl Lindner, Jr. – (1998–2006)
 Bob Castellini – (2006-present)

Cleveland Guardians
 Charles Somers – (1901–1916)
 Jim Dunn – (1916–1922)
 Alva Bradley – (1927–1946)
 Bill Veeck – (1946–1949)
 Ellis Ryan – (1949–1952)
 Myron H. Wilson – (1952–1956)
 William R. Daley – (1956–1962)
 Gabe Paul – (1962–1966)
 Vernon Stouffer – (1966–1972)
 Nick Mileti – (1972–1975)
 Ted Bonda – (1972–1978)
 Steve O'Neill – (1978–1983)
 Richard Jacobs – (1986–1999)
 Larry Dolan – (1999-present)

Colorado Rockies
 Jerry McMorris – (1993–2005)
 Monfort brothers – (2005-Present)

Detroit Tigers
 George Vanderbeck – (1894–1900)
 James D. Burns – (1901–1902)
 Samuel F. Angus – (1902–1903)
 Bill Yawkey – (1903–1908)
 Bill Yawkey & Frank Navin – (1908–1919)
 Frank Navin – (1919–1935)
 The Briggs Family (1935–56)
 Walter Sr. – (1935–1952)
 Walter Jr. – (1952–1956)
 Fred Knorr & John Fetzer – (1956–1961)
 John Fetzer – (1961–1983)
 Tom Monaghan – (1983–1992)
 Ilitch Holdings – (1992-Present)
 Mike (1992-2017)
 Christopher (2017–present)

Houston Astros
 Roy Hofheinz – (1962–1975)
 General Electric & Ford Motor Company – (1975–1979)
 John McMullen – (1979–1993)
 Drayton McLane, Jr. – (1992-2011)
 Jim Crane – (2011-Present)

Kansas City Royals
 Ewing Kauffman – (1969–1993)
 Greater Kansas City Community Foundation (1993–2000)
 David Glass – (2000–2019)
 John Sherman – (2019–present); Patrick Mahomes became a minority partner in 2020.

Los Angeles Angels
 Gene Autry – (1961 – 1996)
 The Walt Disney Company – (1996 – 2003)
 Arturo Moreno – (2003-Present)

Los Angeles Dodgers
 Charles Byrne, Ferdinand Abell – (1883–1890)
 Charles Byrne, Ferdinand Abell, George Chauncey – (1891–1897)
 Charles Ebbets, Ferdinand Abell – (1897–1898)
 Charles Ebbets, Ferdinand Abell, Harry Von der Horst, Ned Hanlon – (1899–1904)
 Charles Ebbets, Ferdinand Abell, Henry Medicus, Ned Hanlon – (1905–1906)
 Charles Ebbets, Henry Medicus – (1907–1912)
 Charles Ebbets, Ed McKeever, Stephen McKeever – (1912–1925)
 Stephen McKeever, heirs of Charles Ebbets and Brooklyn Trust Company – (1925–45)
 Branch Rickey [1], Walter O'Malley, Andrew J. Schmitz. [2] Other minority owners included: John A. Smith, and the heirs of Steve McKeever – (1945–1950)
 Walter O'Malley – (1950–1970), majority owner, at 75 percent, with the Mulvey family representing the McKeever interest
 Peter O'Malley – (1970–1997)
 News Corporation – (1998–2005)
 Frank McCourt – (2005–2012)
 Guggenheim Baseball Partners – (2012–present) – principal partner Mark Walter; minority partners Magic Johnson, Peter Guber, Stan Kasten, Bobby Patton and Todd Boehly.

Miami Marlins
 Wayne Huizenga – (1993–1998; Florida Marlins)
 John W. Henry – (1998–2002)
 Jeffrey Loria – (2002–2017; Florida/Miami Marlins)
 Bruce Sherman – principal partner; Derek Jeter – non-controlling (2017-present)

Milwaukee Brewers
 William Daley – (1969–1970) — Seattle Pilots
 Bud Selig – (1970–2005)
Wendy Selig-Prieb (1992–2005; acting owner of the team in place of her father)
 Mark Attanasio – (2005–present); Giannis Antetokounmpo became a minority partner in 2021.

Minnesota Twins
 Ban Johnson & Fred Postal – (1901 – 1903) – Washington Senators
 Thomas C. Noyes – (1904 – 1912) 
 Benjamin Minor – (1912 – 1920) – 
 The Griffith Family (1920–84)
 Clark – (1920 – 1955) 
 Calvin – (1955 – 1960) Senators; (1961-1984) Minnesota Twins
 The Pohlad Family (1984 - present)
 Carl – (1984-2009)
 Jim – (2009-present)

New York Mets
 Joan Whitney Payson – (1962–1975)
 Charles Shipman Payson – (1975–1980)
 Doubleday & Co. – (1980–1986)
 Nelson Doubleday, Jr. & Fred Wilpon – (1986–2002)
 Fred Wilpon – (2002–2020)
 Steve Cohen & Fred Wilpon – (2020–present)

New York Yankees
William Devery and Frank Farrell, co-owners – (1903–1915)
Tillinghast L'Hommedieu Huston and Jacob Ruppert, co-owners – (1915–1922)
Jacob Ruppert, sole owner - (1922–1939)
Heirs of Jacob Ruppert – (1939–1945)
Ed Barrow, team president – (1939–1944, chairman 1945)
Larry MacPhail, co-owner — (1945–1947)
Dan Topping, co-owner – (1945–64)
Del Webb, co-owner – (1945–64)
Columbia Broadcasting System – (1964–1973)
Team presidents: Dan Topping, 1964–1966; Michael Burke – 1966–1973
The Steinbrenner Family – (1973–present)
 George, 1973–2010 (Principal Owner, chairperson)
 YankeeNets, 1999–2004 (Formed after a merger of the business operations of the Yankees and New Jersey Nets.)
 Yankee Global Enterprises LLC, 2004–present (New name for YankeeNets after the Nets were sold to Bruce Ratner. Company owns the Yankees and the YES Network.
 Brothers Hank and Hal Steinbrenner, acting principal owners from 2007 to 2010; principal owners since 2010, with Hank's interest having passed to his heirs after his death in 2020

Oakland Athletics
 Ben Shibe – (1901–1922) — Philadelphia Athletics
 Connie Mack – (1922–1954)
 Arnold Johnson – (1954–1960) — Kansas City Athletics
 Charlie Finley – (1960–1981) — Kansas City/Oakland Athletics
 Walter Haas – (1981–1995)
 Steve Schott and Ken Hofmann  – (1995–2005)
 Lewis Wolff – (2005–2016)
 John J. Fisher – (2016–present)

Philadelphia Phillies
 Al Reach & John Rogers – (1883–1899)
 John Rogers – (1899–1903)
 James Potter – (1903–1905)
 Bill Shettsline – (1905–1909)
 Horace Fogel – (1909–1913)
 William Baker – (1913–1930)
 Gerald Nugent – (1931–1942)
 William D. Cox – (1943)
 R. R. M. Carpenter – (1943–1950)
 Robert Carpenter – (1950–1972)
 Ruly Carpenter – (1972–1981)
 Bill Giles & David Montgomery – (1981-2013)
 John S. Middleton, David Montgomery, and Jim & Pete Buck — (2013–present)

Pittsburgh Pirates
 Denny McKnight (1881–1887) – Alleghenys
 William A. Nimick (1887–1891) – Alleghenys/Pirates
 William Kerr & Phil Auten (1891–1900)
 Barney Dreyfuss – (1900–1932)
 Bill Benswanger – (1932–1946)
 John W. Galbreath – (1946–1985)
 Pittsburgh Associates – (1985–1996)
 Kevin McClatchy – (1996–2007)
 Robert Nutting – (2007–present)

San Diego Padres
 C. Arnholt Smith – (–)
 Ray Kroc – (–)
 Joan Kroc – (–)
 Tom Werner – (–)
 John Moores – (–)
 Ron Fowler – (–present)

San Francisco Giants
John Day – (-)
C. C. Van Cott – (-)
Andrew Freedman – (-)
John Brush – (–)
Harry Hempstead – (–)
Charles Stoneham – (–)
Horace Stoneham – (–)
Bob Lurie – (–)
Peter Magowan – (–)
Bill Neukom – (–present)

Seattle Mariners
 Danny Kaye – (1977–1980)
 George Argyros – (1980–1989)
 Jeff Smulyan – (1989–1992)
 Hiroshi Yamauchi – (1992–2013)
 Nintendo – (2013–2016)
 First Avenue Entertainment (2016–present)

St. Louis Cardinals
 Chris von der Ahe  – (1882–1899)
 Frank & Stanley Robison – (1899–1911)
 Helene Hathaway Britton – (1911–1917)
 Sam Breadon – (1917–1947)
 Robert Hannegan – (1947–1949)
 Fred Saigh – (1947–1953)
 Anheuser-Busch – (1953–1995)
 William DeWitt, Jr. – (1995-present)

Tampa Bay Rays
 Vince Naimoli – (1998–2005)
 Stuart Sternberg – (2005–present)

Texas Rangers
 Elwood Richard Quesada – (1961–1963) Washington Senators
 James Johnston & James Lemon – 1963–1967)
 James Lemon – (1967–1968)
 Bob Short – (1968–1971) Senators; (1972-1974) Texas Rangers
 Brad Corbett – (1974–1980)
 Eddie Chiles – (1980–1989)
 Richard Rainwater and George W. Bush (managing general partner) – (1989–1998)
 Tom Hicks – (1998–2010)
 Rangers Baseball Express (Chuck Greenberg, Nolan Ryan, and other investors) – (2010–present)
 Ryan sold his interest in the team to the other partners in 2013.

Toronto Blue Jays
 Labatt Brewing Company 45%; R. Howard Webster (chairman/President, The Globe and Mail) 45%; Canadian Imperial Bank of Commerce 10% – (1976–1991)
 John Labatt Limited 90%; Canadian Imperial Bank of Commerce 10% – (1991–1995)
 Interbrew S.A. 90%; Canadian Imperial Bank of Commerce 10% – (1995–2000)
 Rogers Communications 80%; Interbrew S.A. 20% – (2000–2004)
 Rogers Communications (sole owner) – (2004–present)

Washington Nationals
 Charles Bronfman  – (1969–1991) (Montreal Expos)
 Claude Brochu – (1991–1999) (Expos)
 Jeffrey Loria – (1999–2002) (Expos)
 Major League Baseball – (2002–2006)
 Theodore N. Lerner – (2006-present)

Nippon Professional Baseball owners 
In Japanese baseball, teams are traditionally owned by companies and bear that company's name. Only one team in recent years has not borne a corporate name—the Yokohama BayStars went without a corporate name from 1993 through 2011 because its owner chose not to attach its name to the team. The company identifier is indicated in bold type in the owner list.
Chiba Lotte Marines
 Lotte Group

Chunichi Dragons
 Chunichi Shimbun Co., Ltd.

Fukuoka SoftBank Hawks
 Nankai Electric Railway (1938–1988)
Daiei (1988–2005)
 SoftBank Corporation (2005–present)

Hanshin Tigers
 Hanshin Electric Railway

Hiroshima Toyo Carp
 Matsuda family (the founding family of Mazda — about 60%); Mazda (34.2%); other minority shareholders
 The "Toyo" name comes from the former corporate name of Mazda, Toyo Kogyo.

Hokkaido Nippon-Ham Fighters
 Senators (1946) – Did not use a corporate name. Owned by retired Japanese statesman Kinkazu Saionji.
 Tokyu Flyers (1947) – Tokyu Corporation (100%)
 Kyuei Flyers (1948) – Tokyu and Daiei (50-50)
 Tokyu Flyers (1949–1953) – Tokyu (100%)
 Toei Flyers (1954–1972) – Toei Company
 Nittaku Home Flyers (1973) – Not directly owned by a corporation, but bore a corporate name nonetheless. The team was owned that season by Akitaka Nishimura, owner of Nittaku Home.
 Nippon-Ham Fighters (1974–2003), Hokkaido Nippon-Ham Fighters (2004–present) – Nippon Ham

Orix Buffaloes
 Orix

Saitama Seibu Lions
 Prince Hotels (a part of the Seibu Group)

Tohoku Rakuten Golden Eagles
Rakuten

Tokyo Yakult Swallows
 Kokutetsu Swallows (1950–1965) – Japanese National Railways, known as Kokutetsu in Japanese
 Sankei Swallows (brief period in 1965) – Sankei Shimbun
 Sankei Atoms (1965–1968) – Sankei Shimbun
 Atoms (1969) – Sankei Shimbun (chose to drop its corporate name from the team)
 Yakult Atoms (1970–1973), Yakult Swallows (1974–2005), Tokyo Yakult Swallows (2006–present) – Yakult

Yokohama DeNA BayStars
 Taiyō Whales (1950–52) – Taiyō Fishing Company (100%)
 Taiyō-Shōchiku Robins (1953) – Taiyō and Shōchiku (50-50)
 Yō-Shō Robins (1954) – Taiyō and Shōchiku (50-50)
 Taiyō Whales (1954–1977), Yokohama Taiyō Whales (1978–1992) – Taiyō (100%)
 Yokohama BayStars (1993–2011) – Taiyō changed its name to Maruha Corporation, and chose to drop its corporate name from the team.
 Yokohama DeNA BayStars (2012–present) – DeNA

Yomiuri Giants
 Yomiuri Group

Basketball team owners

National Basketball Association owners 
Atlanta Hawks
Ben Kerner (1948–1968, Tri-Cities Blackhawks/Milwaukee Hawks/St. Louis Hawks)
Tom Cousins/Cousins Corporation, Carl Sanders (1968–1976)
Ted Turner/Turner Broadcasting (1977–2004; Time-Warner subsidiary, 1996–2004)
Atlanta Spirit, LLC (2004–2015)
Tony Ressler (2015–present)

Boston Celtics
Walter A. Brown, team founder and original owner (1946–September 7, 1964)
Lou Pieri and Marjorie Brown, wife of team founder (September 7, 1964– June 24, 1965)
Marvin Kratter/Knickerbocker Brewing Company, subsidiary of National Equities (June 24, 1965 – 1968)
Ballantine Brewery, subsidiary of Investors Funding Corporation (1968–1969)
Trans-National Communications (1969–1971)
Ballantine Brewery, subsidiary of Investors Funding Corporation (1971–1972)
Irv Levin and Harold Lipton (April 1972-May 1972) Sale not approved by NBA
Robert Schmertz/Leisure Technology (May 1972–January 1975)
Robert Schmertz/Leisure Technology, Irv Levin, and Harold Lipton (January 1975–November 1975)
Irv Levin and Harold Lipton (November 1975 – 1978)
John Y. Brown, Jr. and Harry T. Mangurian, Jr. (1978–1979)
Harry T. Mangurian, Jr. (1979–1983)
Don Gaston, Alan N. Cohen, Paul Dupee (1983–1993)
Paul Gaston (1993–2002)
Boston Basketball Partners L.L.C. — consisting of Wycliffe Grousbeck, Stephen Pagliuca, and H. Irving Grousbeck (2002–present)

Brooklyn Nets
 Arthur Brown (1967–1969)
 Roy Boe (1969–1978) (New York Nets/New Jersey Nets)
The "Secaucus Seven", a group of local New Jersey businessmen led by Jay Taub and Alan Cohen (1978–1998)
Local real estate developers Raymond Chambers and Lewis Katz (1998–1999)
YankeeNets, a joint venture between Chambers and Katz, and New York Yankees owner George Steinbrenner (1999–2003)
Bruce Ratner (principal owner 2003–2010), Shawn Carter (aka Jay-Z) and other minority owners
Mikhail Prokhorov (principal owner 2010–2019) 
 Jay-Z sold his interest (less than 1%) in 2013 so that his management company, Roc Nation Sports, could represent NBA players.
 In October 2017, billionaire businessman Joseph Tsai announced he agreed to buy a 49% stake in the Nets from Prokhorov. At the time, Tsai also took an option to buy the remaining 51% of the team no later than October 2021.
 Joseph Tsai (2019–present) – Tsai exercised his option to buy Prokhorov's share of the Nets in August 2019, and the sale closed the next month.

Charlotte Hornets
Robert L. Johnson (principal owner 2004–2010); Michael Jordan, Cornell Haynes, Jr. (aka Nelly) later purchased minority interests
Michael Jordan (majority owner, 2010–present); Johnson retained a minority interest, and Nelly's interest is not known to be affected by Jordan's purchase

Chicago Bulls
Dick Klein (1966–1972)
Arthur Wirtz (1972–1983)
Bill Wirtz (1983–1985)
Jerry Reinsdorf (1985–present)

Cleveland Cavaliers
Nick Mileti (1970–1979)
Joe Zingale (minority owner, ?-1979; majority owner, 1979–1980)
Ted Stepien (1980–1983)
Gordon and George Gund III (1983–2004)
Dan Gilbert, Usher Raymond, Gordon Gund (2004–present)

Dallas Mavericks
Don Carter (1980–1996)
H. Ross Perot, Jr. (1996–2000)
Mark Cuban (2000–present)

Denver Nuggets
Red McCombs (1978–1985)
Sidney Shlenker (1985–1989)
Peter Bynoe, Bertram Lee, and Comsat Video Enterprises (1989–1997)
Liberty Media (1997–2000)
Kroenke Sports & Entertainment (2000–present)
 Stan Kroenke, previously a minority owner of the NFL's Rams, acquired full ownership in 2010. Under the NFL's then-current cross-ownership rules, principal team owners were prohibited from owning controlling interests in teams in any other professional sport (except soccer) in a different NFL market. From late 2010 until the cross-ownership ban was permanently lifted in October 2018, his wife Ann Walton Kroenke technically held a controlling interest in order to comply with these rules; their son Josh runs the team's day-to-day affairs.

Detroit Pistons
Fred Zollner (1948–1974)
William Davidson (1974–2009)
Karen Davidson (2009–2011)
Tom Gores (2011–present)

Golden State Warriors
Pete Tyrell (1946–1952, Philadelphia Warriors)
Eddie Gottlieb (1952–1962, Philadelphia Warriors)
Franklin Mieuli (1962–1986, San Francisco/Golden State Warriors)
Jim Fitzgerald (1986–1995)
Chris Cohan (1995–2010)
Peter Guber and Joe Lacob (2010–present)

Houston Rockets
Robert Breitbard (1967–1971, San Diego Rockets)
Billy Goldberg, Wayne Duddlesten, Mickey Herskowitz (1971–1973, Houston Rockets)
Irvin Kaplan 1973–1975
James Talcott Incorporated (1975–1976)
 Kenneth Schnitzer (1976–1979) 
George J. Maloof, Sr. (1979–1980) 
Gavin Maloof (1980–1982) 
Charlie Thomas (1982–1993)
Leslie Alexander (1993–2017)
Tilman Fertitta (2017–present)

Indiana Pacers
Herbert Simon and Melvin Simon

Los Angeles Clippers
Paul Snyder (1970–1976, Buffalo Braves)
John Y. Brown, Jr. (1976–1978, Buffalo Braves majority owner)
Harry T. Mangurian, Jr. (1976–1978, Buffalo Braves minority owner)
Irv Levin (1978–1981, Buffalo Braves/San Diego Clippers)
Donald Sterling (1981–2014, San Diego/Los Angeles Clippers)
Steve Ballmer (2014–present, Los Angeles Clippers)

Los Angeles Lakers
Ben Berger and Morris Chalfen (1948–1957, Minneapolis Lakers)
Bob Short (1957–1965, Minneapolis-Los Angeles Lakers)
Jack Kent Cooke (1965–1979)
Jerry Buss (principal owner, 1979–2013)
Bill Daniels (minority owner, estimated timeframe early 1980s to early 1990s)
Anschutz Entertainment Group (minority owner, 1999–present)
Earvin "Magic" Johnson (4.5% stake, 1994–2010)
Patrick Soon-Shiong (2010–present; acquired Johnson's former interest)
Buss family trust (principal owner, 2013–present) – basketball operations run by Jim Buss and business operations run by Jeanie Buss

Memphis Grizzlies
Orca Bay Sports and Entertainment (1995–2000) (Vancouver Grizzlies)
Michael Heisley (2000–2012)
Robert J. Pera (2012–present)

Miami Heat
Ted Arison (1987–1995), as the majority owner, with minority shareholders Billy Cunningham and Lewis Schaffel running day-to-day business operations.
Micky Arison (1995–present)

Milwaukee Bucks
Milwaukee Professional Sports and Services, Inc. (aka Milwaukee Pro), headed by Wesley Pavalon and Marvin Fishman (1968–1976)
Jim Fitzgerald (principal owner, 1976–85)
U.S. Senator Herb Kohl (1985–2014)
Wesley Edens & Marc Lasry (2014–present)
 Aaron Rodgers bought a minority stake in the team in 2018.

Minnesota Timberwolves
Marv Wolfenson and Harvey Ratner (1989–1994)
Glen Taylor (1994–2023)
Marc Lore & Alex Rodriguez (2023–present)
 Taylor reached a deal with Lore and Rodriguez in April 2021, with the pair initially purchasing 20% with a plan to purchase an additional 20% in 2022 and 40% in 2023, at which time they will be become the principal owners

New Orleans Pelicans
George Shinn (100%, 1988–2007; Charlotte/New Orleans Hornets)
George Shinn (75%) and Gary Chouest (25%) (2007–2010)
National Basketball Association (2010–2012) — The NBA purchased the team in December 2010 after a planned sale of Shinn's interest to Chouest fell through.
Tom Benson (2012–2018)
Gayle Benson (2018–present)
 Gayle Benson is also the owner of the NFL's New Orleans Saints. At the time of Tom Benson's death, NFL rules allowed team owners to own teams in other sports if the other team(s) were in the same media market. In 2013, Gayle's late predecessor and husband Tom Benson announced that the New Orleans Hornets would permanently change their team nickname to the Pelicans.

New York Knicks
James Dolan

Oklahoma City Thunder
Sam Schulman – (1967–1983) (Seattle SuperSonics)
Barry Ackerley – (1983–2001) (SuperSonics)
Howard Schultz – (2001–2006) (SuperSonics)
Professional Basketball Club, LLC — principal owner Clay Bennett, minority owners Jeffrey Records, Jr. and George Kaiser

Orlando Magic
William du Pont III, Jim L. Hewit, and Robert Hewitt (1989–1991)
Richard DeVos (1991–present)

Philadelphia 76ers
Danny Biasone (1946–1963, Syracuse Nationals)
Irv Kosloff (1963–1976)
Fitz Eugene Dixon Jr. (1976–1981)
Harold Katz (1981–1996)
Comcast Spectacor (1996–2011)
Josh Harris (2011–present)

Phoenix Suns
Jerry Colangelo (1987–2004)
Robert Sarver (2004–present)
 Larry Fitzgerald bought a minority stake in the team in January 2020.

Portland Trail Blazers
Herman Sarkowsky, Robert Schmertz, and Larry Weinberg (1970–1972)
Herman Sarkowsky & Larry Weinberg (1972–1975)
Larry Weinberg (1975–1988)
Paul Allen (1988–2018)
Estate of Paul Allen (2018–present)
 From 1997 to 2018, Paul Allen was also the principal owner of the NFL's Seattle Seahawks. At the time he purchased the Seahawks in 1997, the NFL had a blanket prohibition of cross-ownership (apart from soccer), but the league soon modified the rule to allow NFL owners to own teams in other leagues under either of the following conditions:
 The other team is in the same market as the owner's NFL team.
 The other team is in a market without an NFL team, as is the case with Portland.

Sacramento Kings
 Jack Harrison, Les Harrison (1946-1958, Rochester Royals/Cincinnati Royals)
 Thomas E. Wood (1958-1963, Cincinnati Royals)
 Louis Jacobs (1963-1968, Cincinnati Royals)
 Jeremy Jacobs, Max Jacobs (1968-1973, Cincinnati Royals/Kansas City/Omaha Kings
 Leon Karosen, H. Paul Rosenberg & Robert Margolin (1973-1983, Kansas City Kings)
 Joseph Benvenuti, Gregg Lukenbill, Frank Lukenbill, Stephen Cippa, Robert Cook & Frank McCormick (1983-1985, Kansas City Kings)
Gregg Lukenbill and Joe Benvenuti (1985–1992)
Jim Thomas (1992–1999)
Maloof family (53%), Bob Hernreich (12%), and other minority investors (operated by George, Joe and Gavin Maloof) (1999–2013)
Vivek Ranadive (2013–present)

San Antonio Spurs
Angelo Drossos (1973–1988)
Red McCombs (1988–1993)
Peter Holt (1993–2016)
Julianna Holt (2016–present)

Toronto Raptors
John Bitove 44%, Allan Slaight (Slaight Communications) 44%, Bank of Nova Scotia 10%, David Peterson 1%, Phil Granovsky 1% (1993–1995)
John Bitove 39.5%, Allan Slaight 39.5%, Bank of Nova Scotia 10%, Isiah Thomas 9%, David Peterson 1%, Phil Granovsky 1% (1995)
Allan Slaight 81%, Bank of Nova Scotia 10%, Isiah Thomas 9% (1996–1997)
Maple Leaf Sports & Entertainment Ltd. (1998–present)

Utah Jazz
Sam Battistone (1974–1985), New Orleans/Utah Jazz
Sam Battistone and Larry Miller (50-50, 1985–1986)
Larry Miller (100%, 1986–2009)
Greg Miller and Gail Miller (2009–2020)
Ryan and Ashley Smith (2020–present)

Washington Wizards
David Trager (1961–1964) — Chicago Packers/Zephyrs, Baltimore Bullets
Abe Pollin (majority owner), Earl Foreman, and Arnold Heft (1964–1968) — Baltimore Bullets
Abe Pollin (100%, 1968–1999) — Baltimore/Capital/Washington Bullets, Washington Wizards
Abe Pollin (56%) and Ted Leonsis (44%) (1999–2009)
Estate of Abe Pollin and Ted Leonsis (2009–2010)
Ted Leonsis (2010–present)

Women's National Basketball Association owners 
Atlanta Dream
Ron Terwilliger (2008–2009)
Kathy Betty (2010)
Dream Too LLC, composed of Mary Brock and Kelly Loeffler (2011–2021)
 Larry Gottesdiener (majority owner), Suzanne Abair, and Renee Montgomery (2021–present)

Chicago Sky
Michael J. Alter and Margaret Stender (2006–present)

Connecticut Sun
RDV Sports, Inc. (1998–2002), Orlando Miracle
Mohegan Sun (2003–present)

Dallas Wings
 William Davidson (1998–2009), Detroit Shock
 Tulsa Pro Hoops LLC, composed of Bill Cameron, David Box, Chris Christian, Sam and Rita Combs, and Paula Marshall (2009–2015), Tulsa Shock 
 Bill Cameron (majority owner), Chris Christian, and Mark Yancey (2015–present)

Indiana Fever
 Herb and Melvin Simon (2000–2009)
 Herb Simon (2009–present)

Las Vegas Aces
 Larry H. Miller (1997–2002), Utah Starzz
 Peter Holt (2003–2017), San Antonio Stars
 MGM Resorts International (2017–2021)
 Mark Davis (2021–present)

Los Angeles Sparks
Jerry Buss (1997–2006)
Gemini Basketball LLC, composed of Carla Christofferson, Kathy Goodman, and Lynai Jones (2006–2011)
Williams Group Holdings (Paula Madison) (2011–2014) and Carla Christofferson, Kathy Goodman, and Lisa Leslie (2011–2013)
Sparks LA Sports, LLC (Mark Walter, Magic Johnson, Stan Kasten, Todd Boehly and Bobby Patton) (2014–present)

Minnesota Lynx
Glen Taylor (1999–present)

New York Liberty
 Cablevision (1997–2009)
 Madison Square Garden, Inc. (2010–2019)
 Joe Tsai (2019–Present)

Phoenix Mercury
Jerry Colangelo (1997–2003)
Robert Sarver (2004–present)

Seattle Storm
Bill and Ginger Ackerley (2000–2001)
Howard Schultz (2001–2006)
Clay Bennett (2007)
Force 10 Hoops LLC, composed of Dawn Trudeau, Lisa Brummel, Ginny Gilder (2008–present)

Washington Mystics
Abe Pollin (1998–2005)
Monumental Sports & Entertainment/Ted Leonsis (2005–present)

National Basketball League (Australia) owners 
Adelaide 36ers
Grant Kelley (March 2017–present)

Illawarra Hawks
Dorry Kordahi, Bryan Colangelo & Micahel Proctor

Perth Wildcats
Jack Bendat

Euroleague (Europe) owners 
Fenerbahçe
Ali Koç

Olympiacos
Panagiotis Angelopoulos-Giorgos Angelopoulos

Panathinaikos
Dimitrios Giannakopoulos
Olimpia Milano
Giorgio Armani

ASVEL
Tony Parker

Gridiron football franchise owners

National Football League owners

Arizona Cardinals
 Chris O'Brien (1898–1929) — Morgan Athletic Club (Chicago, 1898–1899?), Racine Normals (still in Chicago, 1899?–1901), Racine Cardinals (1901–1921), Chicago Cardinals (1922–1929)
 Dr. David Jones (1929–1933)
 The Bidwill Family (1933–present)
 Charles Bidwill (1933–1947)
 Virginia Wolfner (widow) (1947–1962) — Chicago/St. Louis Cardinals
 Bill Bidwill and Charles Jr. (sons of Charles) (1962–1972)
 Bill (1972–2019) (bought out brother) — St. Louis/Phoenix/Arizona Cardinals
 Michael Bidwill (son) (2019–present)

Atlanta Falcons
 The Smith Family (1966-2002)
 Rankin M. Smith Sr. – (1966–1997)
 Taylor (son) – (1997–2002)
 Arthur Blank – (2002–present) — owns over 90%; seven minority partners own the rest, with Warrick Dunn the latest addition in March 2010

Baltimore Ravens
 Art Modell – 1996–2004
 Steve Bisciotti – 2004–present

Buffalo Bills
 Ralph Wilson – (1959–2014)
 Estate of Ralph Wilson (2014)
 Terrence Pegula and Kim Pegula – (September 2014 – present)

Carolina Panthers
 Jerry Richardson – (1995–2018)
 David Tepper – (2018–present)

Chicago Bears
 A. E. Staley (1919–1921) — Decatur/Chicago Staleys
 George Halas and Dutch Sternaman – (1921–1933)
 The Halas Family – (1933–present)
 George Halas (1933–1983)
 Virginia McCaskey (daughter) – (1983–present)

Cincinnati Bengals
 The Brown family:
 Paul Brown – (1968–1991)
 Mike Brown – (1991–present)

Cleveland Browns
 Mickey McBride – (1946–1953)
 David Jones – (1953–1961)
 Art Modell – (1961–1995)
 Operations suspended franchise held in "Cleveland Browns Trust" 1996–1998. See Cleveland Browns relocation controversy for more details.
 Al Lerner – (1998–2002)
 Randy Lerner – (2002–2012)
 Jimmy Haslam – (2012–present)

Dallas Cowboys
 Clint Murchison – (1960–1984)
 Bum Bright – (1984–1989)
 Jerry Jones – (1989–present)

Denver Broncos
 Bob Howsam – (1959–1961)
 Gerald Phipps – (1961–1981)
 Edgar Kaiser – (1981–1984)
 Pat Bowlen – (1984–2019)
 Pat Bowlen estate – (2019-2022)
 Rob Walton, Carrie Walton Penner & Greg Penner — (2022–present) 

Detroit Lions
 George A. Richards – (1934–1940)
 Fred Mandel – (1940–1948)
 Detroit Football Company – (1948–1964)
 William Clay Ford family
 William Clay Sr. – (1964–2014)
 Martha Firestone Ford (widow) – (2014–2020)
 Sheila Ford Hamp (daughter) - (2020–present)

Green Bay Packers
 John & J. Emmett Clair, Earl "Curly" Lambeau, George Whitney Calhoun – (1919–1923)
 Community ownership (1923–present)
 Green Bay Football Corporation (1923–1935)
 Green Bay Packers, Inc. (1935–present; non-profit representing ≈360,760 shareholders)

Houston Texans
 The McNair Family
 Robert C. McNair – (2002–2018)
 Janice McNair (widow) – (2018–present)

Indianapolis Colts
 Carroll Rosenbloom – (1953–1972)
 The Irsay family – (1972–present)
 Robert Irsay (1972–1997) — Baltimore/Indianapolis Colts
 Jim Irsay (1997–present)

Jacksonville Jaguars
 Wayne Weaver – (1995–2012)
 Shahid Khan – (2012–present)

Kansas City Chiefs
 The Hunt family – (1959–present)
 Lamar (1960–2006) — Dallas Texans/Kansas City Chiefs
 Family, led by son Clark – (2006–present)

Las Vegas Raiders
 Limited partnership led by Y. Charles (Chet) Soda – (1959–1960)
 F. Wayne Valley and Ed McGah – (1961–1966)
 Valley, McGah and Al Davis – (1966–1976)
 Al Davis and McGah (1976–1983) – Oakland/Los Angeles Raiders
 Al Davis (1983–2011) — Los Angeles/Oakland Raiders
 Mark and Carol Davis – (2011–present) – Oakland/Las Vegas Raiders
Note: This list reflects the actual control of the franchise. The ownership structure is considerably more complicated. Notably, it was reported that Al Davis owned only a 47% stake in the team when he died in 2011, although he exercised near-total control as the president of the team's general partner. His widow Carol and son Mark inherited his interest in the team, with Mark exercising day-to-day control. See the relevant section of the team article for more details.

Los Angeles Chargers
 Barron Hilton (1959–1966) — Los Angeles/San Diego Chargers
 Gene Klein (majority owner) and Sam Schulman (1966–1984) — San Diego Chargers
 Alex Spanos – (1984–2018)
 Dean Spanos – (2018–present)

 Los Angeles Rams
 Homer Marshman (1936–1941?) — Cleveland Rams
 Dan Reeves (1941–1971) — Cleveland/Los Angeles Rams
 Robert Irsay – (1971–1972)
 Carroll Rosenbloom – (1972–1979)
 Georgia Frontiere (1979–1995) — Los Angeles Rams
 Georgia Frontiere (60%) and Stan Kroenke (40%) (1995–2008) — St. Louis Rams
 Chip Rosenbloom, Lucia Rodriguez (combined 60%), and Stan Kroenke (40%) – (2008–2010)
 Stan Kroenke – (2010–present)

Miami Dolphins
 Joe Robbie and Danny Thomas – (1965–1966?)
 Joe Robbie – (1966?–1990)
 Robbie family and Wayne Huizenga – (1990–1993)
 Wayne Huizenga – (100%, 1993–2008)
 Stephen M. Ross (50%) and Huizenga (50%) – (2008–2009)
 Ross (up to 95%) and Huizenga (5%) (2009–present) — unknown, but likely small, percentages also owned by Gloria and Emilio Estefan, Marc Anthony and Jennifer Lopez, Jimmy Buffett, Fergie, and Serena and Venus Williams

Minnesota Vikings

 Bill Boyer, H. P. Skoglund, Max Winter, Bernard H. Ridder, and Ole Haugsrud – (1960–1973)
 Skoglund, Winter, Ridder, Haugsrud and Boyer family – (1973–1976)
 Skoglund, Winter, Ridder, and Boyer family – (1976–1977)
 Winter, Skoglund family and Boyer family – (1977–1986)
 Skoglund family, Boyer family, Carl Pohlad, and Irwin Jacobs – (1986–1991)
 Roger Headrick and nine equal partners – (1991–1998)
 Red McCombs – (1998–2005)
 Zygi Wilf and family – (2005–present)

New England Patriots
 Billy Sullivan – (1960–1987)
 Victor Kiam – (1987–1992)
 James Orthwein – (1992–1994)
 Robert Kraft – (1994–present)

New Orleans Saints
 John W. Mecom, Jr. – (1967–1985)
 The Benson family (1985–present)
 Tom – (1985–2018)
 Gayle (widow) – (2018–present)

New York Giants
 The Mara Family – (1925–present; 100 percent ownership, 1925–1991, 50 percent ownership since 1991)
Tim J. – (1925–1959)
Jack – (1930–1965)
Wellington – (1930–2005)
Tim – (1965–1991)
John – (2005–present)
 The Tisch Family – (1991–present; 50 percent ownership)
Bob – (1991–2005)
Jonathan – (2006–present)

New York Jets
 Harry Wismer (1959–1963) — New York Titans
 Sonny Werblin, Leon Hess, Donald C. Lillis, Townsend B. Martin, Philip H. Iselin – (1963–1968)
 Leon Hess, Donald C. Lillis, Townsend B. Martin, Philip H. Iselin – (1968)
 Leon Hess, Townsend B. Martin, Philip H. Iselin – (1968–1976)
 Leon Hess, Townsend B. Martin – (1976–1981)
 Leon Hess – (1981–1999)
 Estate of Leon Hess – (1999–2000)
 Woody Johnson – (2000–present)

Philadelphia Eagles
 Bert Bell and Lud Wray – (1933–1940)
 Bell and Alexis Thompson – (1940–1946)
 Thompson and 63 stockholders (nicknamed the "Happy Hundred") – (1946–1963)
 Jerry Wolman – (1963–1969)
 Leonard Tose – (1969–1985)
 Norman Braman and Ed Leibowitz – (1985)
 Norman Braman – (1986–1994)
 Jeffrey Lurie – (1994–present)

Pittsburgh Steelers
 The Rooney family:
 Art – (1933–1988)
 Dan – (1988–2017)
 Art II – (2017–present)

San Francisco 49ers
 Tony Morabito, Victor Morabito, Allen E. Sorrell and E.J. Turre – (1946)
 Tony and Victor Morabito – (1947–1953)
 Morabito, Morabito, and Al Ruffo – (1953–1957)
 Josephine Morabito, Victor Morabito, and Ruffo – (1957–1964)
 Josephine Morabito, Elizabeth Morabito, and Ruffo – (1964–1977)
 The DeBartolo Family (1977–present)
 Eddie DeBartolo, Jr. and Denise DeBartolo York (father-daughter) – (1977–2000)
 Denise DeBartolo York and John York (daughter and her husband) – (2000–present)
Jed York (third generation) – (2008–present)

Seattle Seahawks
 Nordstrom family – (1976–1988)
 Ken Behring – (1988–1997)
 Paul Allen – (1997–2018)
 Estate of Paul Allen – (2018–present)

Tampa Bay Buccaneers
 Hugh Culverhouse – (1976–1994)
 Hugh Culverhouse, Jr. – (1994–1995)
 The Glazer family – (1995–present)
 Malcolm Glazer – (1995–2014)
Bryan Glazer, Joel Glazer, and Ed Glazer – (1995–present)

Tennessee Titans
 Kenneth S. Adams, Jr. family – (1959–present)
 Kenneth S., Jr. (Bud) (1959–2013) — Houston/Tennessee Oilers, Tennessee Titans
 Amy Adams Strunk (33%), Susan Lewis, Kenneth Adams IV (33%), Barclay Adams (33%) (Lewis is the widow of Amy Strunk and Susie Smith's brother;  Kenneth IV and Barclay are Lewis' sons), Thomas and Susie Smith (33%)– (2013–2020)
 Amy Adams Strunk (50%), Kenneth Adams IV (16.67%), Barclay Adams (16.67%) and Susan Lewis (16.67%) – (2020–present)

Washington Commanders
 George Preston Marshall (1932–1969) — Boston Braves, Boston/Washington Redskins
 Edward Bennett Williams – (1969–1974)
 Jack Kent Cooke and Edward Bennett Williams – (1974–1985)
 Jack Kent Cooke – (1985–1997)
 Jack Kent Cooke foundation – (1997–1999)
 Daniel Snyder – (1999–present)

Canadian Football League owners 
BC Lions
Community ownership (1954–1989)
Murray Pezim (1990–1992)
Canadian Football League (1992)
Bill Comrie (1993–1996)
Nelson Skalbania (1996)
David Braley (1997–2020)
Amar Doman (2021–present)

Calgary Stampeders
 Community ownership (1945–1991)
 Larry Ryckman (1991–1996)
 Sig Gutsche (1996–2001)
 Michael Feterik (2001–2005)
 Ted Hellard, Doug Mitchell, & John Forzani (2005–2012)
 Calgary Sports and Entertainment(N. Murray Edwards, chairman) (2012–present)

Edmonton Elks
 Community ownership (1949–present)

Hamilton Tiger-Cats
 Community ownership (1950–mid. 1970's)
 Michael DeGroote (mid. 1970's–1978)
 Harold Ballard (1978–1989)
 David Braley (1989–1990)
 Community ownership (1990–1995)
 George Grant and David Macdonald (1995–2003)
 League owned (2003)
 Bob Young (2003–present)

Montreal Alouettes
 Léo Dandurand (1946–1954)
 Ted Workman (1954–1967)
 Joe Atwell (1967–1969)
 Sam Berger (1969–1981)
 Nelson Skalbania (1981–1982)
 Charles Bronfman (1982–1987)
 Defunct/Dormant (1987–1996)
 Jim Speros (1996–1997)
 Robert C. Wetenhall (1997–2019)
 League owned (2019–2020)
 S and S Sportsco (Sid Spiegel and Gary Stern) (2020–present)

Ottawa Redblacks
 Community ownership (1876–1930; as Ottawa Rough Riders)
 Sam Berger (1930–1968; as Ottawa Rough Riders)
 David Loeb (1969–1977; as Ottawa Rough Riders)
 Allan Waters (1977–?; as Ottawa Rough Riders)
 Community ownership (?–1991; as Ottawa Rough Riders)
 Bernard Glieberman (1991–1994; as Ottawa Rough Riders)
 Bruce Firestone (1994; as Ottawa Rough Riders)
 Horn Chen (1995; as Ottawa Rough Riders)
 Defunct/Dormant (1996–2006)
 Bernard Glieberman (2002–2006; as Ottawa Renegades)
 Defunct/Dormant (2006–2008)
 Ottawa Sports and Entertainment Group(Jeff Hunt, chairman) (2008–present)

Saskatchewan Roughriders
 Community ownership (1911–present)

Toronto Argonauts
 Argonaut Rowing Club (1873–1956)
 John Bassett, Charlie Burns, & Eric Cradock (1956–1960)
 John Bassett, Charlie Burns, & Len Lumbers (1960–1971)
 Baton Broadcasting (1971–1974)
 William R. Hodgson (1974–1976)
 William R. Hodgson & Carling O'Keefe (1976–1979)
 Carling O'Keefe (1979–1988)
 Carling O'Keefe & Harry Ornest (1988–1991)
 Bruce McNall, John Candy, & Wayne Gretzky (1991–1994)
 TSN (1994–1995)
 Labatt Brewing Company (1995–1999)
 Sherwood Schwarz (1999–2003)
 League owned (2003)
 Howard Sokolowski and David Cynamon (2003–2010)
 David Braley (2010–2015)
 Larry Tanenbaum & Bell Canada (2015–2017)
 Maple Leaf Sports & Entertainment (2018–present)

Winnipeg Blue Bombers
 Community ownership (1930–present)

Ice Hockey franchise owners

National Hockey League owners 
Anaheim Ducks
The Walt Disney Company – 1993–2005 (Mighty Ducks of Anaheim)
Henry & Susan Samueli – 2005–present

Arizona Coyotes
Barry Shenkarow – 1979-1996 (Winnipeg Jets)
Steven Gluckstern and Richard Burke – 1996–1998 (Phoenix Coyotes)
Richard Burke – 1998–2001 (Phoenix Coyotes)
Steve Ellman, Wayne Gretzky, and Jerry Moyes – 2001–2006 (Phoenix Coyotes)
Wayne Gretzky and Jerry Moyes – 2006–2009 (Phoenix Coyotes)
National Hockey League – 2009–2013 (Phoenix Coyotes)
IceArizona – 2013–2017 (team rebranded as Arizona Coyotes in 2014)
Andrew Barroway – 2017–2019
Alex Meruelo – 2019–present

Boston Bruins
Charles Adams – 1924–1947
Weston Adams, Sr. – 1947–1951
Boston Garden-Arena Corporation – 1951–1973
Storer Broadcasting – 1973–1975
Jeremy Jacobs – 1975–present

Buffalo Sabres
Seymour H. Knox III and Northrup Knox – 1970–1996
John Rigas – 1996–2002
National Hockey League – 2002–2003
Tom Golisano and Larry Quinn – 2003–2011
Pegula Sports and Entertainment (Terry and Kim Pegula) – 2011–present

Calgary Flames
Tom Cousins  – 1972-1980 (Atlanta Flames)
Calgary Sports and Entertainment (Harley Hotchkiss, Allan P. Markin, Clayton H. Riddell, Daryl Seaman, N. Murray Edwards) – 1980–present

Carolina Hurricanes
Howard Baldwin, Don Conrad and 14 other Hartford-based partners – 1979-1988 (Hartford Whalers)
Richard Gordon and Don Conrad – 1988-1989 (Hartford Whalers)
Richard Gordon, and Colonial Whalers (Benjamin J. Sisti, Johnathan N. Googel and Frank Shuch) – 1989-1992 (Hartford Whalers)
Richard Gordon  – 1992-1994 (Hartford Whalers)
Peter Karmanos, Jr., Thomas Thewes and Jim Rutherford – 1994–2008 (Hartford Whalers/Carolina Hurricanes)
Peter Karmanos, Jr. and Jim Rutherford  – 2008-2015
Peter Karmanos, Jr. – 2015-2018
Thomas Dundon – 2018–present

Chicago Blackhawks
Frederic McLaughlin – 1926–1944
Estate of Frederic McLaughlin – 1944–1946
James E. Norris and Bill Tobin – 1946–1952
James D. Norris and Arthur Wirtz – 1952–1966
Wirtz Corporation (1966–present)
William Wadsworth Wirtz – 1966–2007
William Rockwell Wirtz – 2007–present

Colorado Avalanche
Carling O'Keefe  – 1979-1988 (Quebec Nordiques)
Quebec Hockey Club Consortium (Marcel Aubut)  – 1988-1995 (Quebec Nordiques)
Ascent Entertainment Group (Charlie Lyons) – 1995–2000
Kroenke Sports & Entertainment – 2000–present
 As noted in the NBA section, Stan Kroenke has technically transferred a controlling interest in the Avalanche to his son, Josh Kroenke, in order to comply with NFL cross-ownership rules.

Columbus Blue Jackets
The McConnell Family – 2000–present
John H. – 2000–2008
John P. – 2008–present

Dallas Stars
Walter Bush and W. John Driscoll  – 1967-1978(Minnesota North Stars)
George and Gordon Gund – 1978-1991(Minnesota North Stars)
Norman Green – 1991–1995 (Minnesota North Stars/Dallas Stars)
Tom Hicks – 1995–2011
Tom Gaglardi – 2011–present

Detroit Red Wings
Charles A. Hughes – 1926–1931 (Detroit Cougars/Detroit Falcons)
Creditors' Committee – 1931–1933 (Detroit Falcons/Detroit Red Wings)
The Norris Family – 1933-1982
James E. Norris – 1933–1952
Marguerite Norris – 1952–1955
Bruce Norris – 1955–1982
The Ilitch family – 1982–present
Mike Ilitch – 1982–2017
Christopher Ilitch – 2017–present

Edmonton Oilers
Peter Pocklington – 1979–1998
Edmonton Investors Group Limited Partnership – 1998–2008
Daryl Katz – 2008–present

Florida Panthers
Wayne Huizenga – 1993–2001
Alan Cohen and Bernie Kosar – 2001–2009
Vincent Viola  – 2009–present

Los Angeles Kings
Jack Kent Cooke – 1967–1979
Jerry Buss – 1979–1987
Bruce McNall – 1987–1994
Joseph Cohen and Jeffrey Sudikoff – 1994–1995
Philip Anschutz and Edward Roski, Jr. (AEG) – 1995–present

Minnesota Wild
Bob Naegele, Jr. – 1997–2008
Craig Leipold – 2008–present

Montreal Canadiens
J. Ambrose O'Brien – 1909–1910
George Kennedy – 1910–1921
Joseph Cattarinich, Leo Dandurand, and Louis Letourneau – 1921–1930
Joseph Cattarinich and Leo Dandurand – 1930–1935
Ernest Savard, Maurice Forget, and Louis Gelinas – 1935–1940
Donat Raymond and William Northey – 1940–1957
Hartland Molson and Tom Molson – 1957–1964
David Molson, Peter Molson, and William Molson – 1964–1971
Edward Bronfman and Peter Bronfman – 1971–1978
Molson Brewing Company – 1978–2001
George N. Gillett, Jr. – 2001–2009
Geoff Molson, Andrew Molson, and Justin Molson – 2009–present

Nashville Predators
Craig Leipold – 1998–2007
David Freeman – 2007–present

New Jersey Devils
Edwin G. Thompson  – 1974-1976 (Kansas City Scouts)
Jack Vickers Jr.  – (Colorado Rockies)
John McMullen – 1982–2000
YankeeNets – 2000–2004
Jeffrey Vanderbeek – 2004–2013
Joshua Harris – 2013–present

New York Islanders
Roy Boe – 1972–1978
John Pickett – 1978–1997
John Spano – 1997
Howard Milstein and Steven Gluckstern – 1997–2000
Charles Wang and Sanjay Kumar – 2000–2006
Charles Wang – 2006–2016
Jon Ledecky and Scott D. Malkin, minority owner Charles Wang – 2016–2018
Jon Ledecky and Scott D. Malkin  – 2018–present

New York Rangers
Madison Square Garden, Inc. – 1926–present

Ottawa Senators
Bruce Firestone – 1992
Rod Bryden – 1992–2003
Eugene Melnyk – 2003–2022
Anna Melnyk and Olivia Melnyk – 2022–present

Philadelphia Flyers
Ed Snider – 1967–1996
Comcast Spectacor and Ed Snider – 1996–2016
Comcast Spectacor – 2016–present

Pittsburgh Penguins
 Jack McGregor and Peter Block – 1965–1968
 Donald Parsons – 1968–1971
 Peter Block, Elmore Keener, and Peter Burchfield – 1971–1975
 National Hockey League – 1975
 Al Savill, Otto Frenzel, and Wren Blair – 1975–1976
 Al Savill and Otto Frenzel – 1976–1977
 Edward J. DeBartolo, Sr. – 1977–1991
 Howard Baldwin, Morris Belzberg, and Thomas Ruta – 1991–1997
 Howard Baldwin, Morris Belzberg, Thomas Ruta, and Roger Marino – 1997–1999
 Mario Lemieux and Ron Burkle – 1999–present

San Jose Sharks
 Gordon Gund and George Gund Gund – 1991–2001
 San Jose Sports & Entertainment Enterprises – 2001–present

Seattle Kraken
 David Bonderman, Jerry Bruckheimer, and Tod Leiweke – 2021–present

St. Louis Blues
 Sid Salomon, Jr., Sid Salomon III, and Robert Wolfson – 1967–1977
 Ralston Purina – 1977–1983
 Harry Ornest – 1983–1986
 Michael Shanahan, Sr. – 1986–1999
 Bill Laurie and Nancy Walton Laurie – 1999–2005
 Dave Checketts – 2005–2012
 Tom Stillman via SLB Acquisition Holdings LLC – 2012–present

Tampa Bay Lightning
Kokusai Green – 1992–1998
Arthur L. Williams, Jr. – 1998–1999
William Davidson – 1999–2007
Oren Koules and Len Barrie – 2007–2010
Jeffrey Vinik – 2010–present

Toronto Maple Leafs
Toronto Arena Company – 1917–1919 (Toronto Arenas)
Charles Querrie – 1919–1927 (Toronto St. Patricks)
Conn Smythe – 1927–1961
Stafford Smythe, Harold Ballard, and John Bassett – 1961–1970
Stafford Smythe and Harold Ballard – 1970–1972
Harold Ballard – 1972–1990
Estate of Harold Ballard – 1990–1991
Steve Stavro – 1991–1996
Steve Stavro and Larry Tanenbaum – 1996–1998
Maple Leaf Sports & Entertainment Ltd. – 1998–present

Vancouver Canucks
Thomas Scallen – 1970–1974
Frank Griffiths – 1974–1988
Arthur Griffiths – 1988–1997
John McCaw, Jr. – 1997–2004
John McCaw, Jr. and Francesco Aquilini – 2004–2006
Francesco Aquilini – 2006–present

Vegas Golden Knights
Black Knight Sports & Entertainment: Bill Foley (85%), Maloof family (15%) – 2017–present

Washington Capitals
Abe Pollin – 1974–1999
Monumental Sports & Entertainment – 1999–present

Winnipeg Jets 
Ted Turner and Time Warner  – 1999-2003 (Atlanta Thrashers)
Atlanta Spirit Group  – 2003-2011 (Atlanta Thrashers)
True North Sports and Entertainment – 2011–present

Rugby League Football club owners

National Rugby League owners

Brisbane Broncos
News Corporation Majority ownership of the Brisbane Broncos (68.9%)

Melbourne Storm 
News Corporation Full ownership

Newcastle Knights
Wests Leagues Club (Newcastle)

South Sydney Rabbitohs
Russell Crowe
Peter Holmes à Court

Super League owners

Rugby Union Football club owners

Aviva Premiership (England) 
Bath
 Andrew Brownsword (??–2010)
 Bruce Craig (2010–present)

Bristol
 Stephen Lansdown (2012–present)

Gloucester
 Owned by a large number of investors until 1997
 Tom Walkinshaw (1997–2010)
 Martin St Quinton (minority interest, 2008–2016)
 Ryan Walkinshaw (majority interest, December 2010–February 2016)
 Martin St Quinton (majority interest, February 2016–present)

Newcastle Falcons
 John Hall (1996–1999)
 Dave Thompson (1999–present)

Sale Sharks
 Brian Kennedy (?-present)

Wasps
 Steve Hayes (??–2013)
 Derek Richardson and minority investors (2013–present)

Guinness Pro14 
Aironi (operated from 2010 to 2012; now defunct)
 Eight rugby clubs in Italy: Rugby Viadana 54%, Colorno 15%, Gran Parma Rugby 10%, Rugby Parma 10%, Noceto 5%, Reggio Emilia 2%, Modena 2% and Mantova 2%.
 After the formation of Aironi, Gran Parma, Viadana and Colorno merged to form GranDucato Rugby Parma, and Rugby Parma and Noceto merged to form Crociati Parma Rugby.

Benetton Rugby
 Benetton

Cardiff Blues
 Cardiff RFC

Cheetahs (joined in 2017)
 Free State Rugby Union

Connacht, Leinster, Munster and Ulster
 All are owned and operated by the respective provincial branches of the Irish Rugby Football Union, the sport's governing body throughout the island of Ireland.

Dragons
 Newport RFC and the Welsh Rugby Union (2003–2017; 50-50 partnership)
 Welsh Rugby Union (2017–present, 100%)

Edinburgh Rugby and Glasgow Warriors 
 Both are owned and operated by the Scottish Rugby Union, the sport's governing body in Scotland.

Ospreys
 Neath RFC and Swansea RFC (50-50 partnership)

Scarlets
 Llanelli RFC

Southern Kings (joined in 2017)
 Eastern Province Rugby Union

Zebre (took Aironi's place in the league in 2012)
 Italian Rugby Federation

Top 14 and Pro D2 (France) 
Brive
 Daniel Derichebourg
 Derichebourg has put the club up for sale.

Castres
 Pierre Fabre

Montpellier
 Mohed Altrad

Perpignan
 Paul Goze

Racing 92
 Jacky Lorenzetti

Stade Français
Max Guazzini (majority owner, 1992–June 2011); unknown percentage also owned by Christophe Dominici in the last years of Guazzini's ownership
 Jean-Pierre Savare (majority owner, June 2011–May 2017)
 Hans-Peter Wild (May 2017–)

Toulon
Mourad Boudjellal

Cricket club owners

India

Indian Premier League owners 
Kolkata Knight Riders
Shahrukh Khan (Red Chillies Entertainment)
Juhi Chawla
Jay Mehta (Mehta Group)

Chennai Super Kings
Varun Manian (India Cements)

Delhi Daredevils
JSW Sports
Grandhi Mallikarjuna Rao (GMR)

Kings XI Punjab
Preity Zinta (PZNZ Media)
Ness Wadia (Bombay Dyeing)
Mohit Burman (Dabur Group)

Mumbai Indians
Mukesh Ambani (Reliance Group)
Teesta Retail

Rajasthan Royals
Lachlan Murdoch (Emerging Media)
Shilpa Shetty
Raj Kundra (UK Tradecorp Ltd)

Royal Challengers Bangalore
UB Group

Sunrisers Hyderabad
Kalanidhi Maran (Sun Group)

References

Sports owners
Sport-related lists